Dynein heavy chain 11, axonemal is a protein that in humans is encoded by the DNAH11 gene.

Function
This gene encodes a member of the dynein heavy chain family. It is a microtubule-dependent motor ATPase and has been reported to be involved in the movement of respiratory cilia. Mutations in this gene have been implicated in causing primary ciliary dyskinesia (PCD, formerly called 'immotile cilia syndrome') and Kartagener syndrome (PCD with situs inversus totalis). Males with PCD are not sterile, but are infertile due to lack of sperm motility. There are reports of subfertility and increased risk of ectopic pregnancy in women with PCD.

References

Further reading

External links
 GeneReviews/NCBI/NIH/UW entry on Primary Ciliary Dyskinesia